The Pine Brook Covered Bridge, also called the Wilder Covered Bridge, is a wooden covered bridge that crosses Pine Brook in Waitsfield, Vermont on North Road. Built in 1872, it is one two surviving 19th-century covered bridges in the town. It was listed on the National Register of Historic Places in 1974.

Description and history
The Pine Brook Bridge stands in a rural area of northern Waitsfield, carrying North Road, a principal road in the area, across Pine Brook, a tributary of the Mad River to the west. It rests on stone abutments faced in concrete, and its wooden bridge deck is supported by steel I-beams. Its exterior is clad in vertical board siding, which extends a short way inside the portals. The roof is standing seam metal.

The bridge was built in 1872. It is one of only two historic covered bridges (the other being the Stony Brook Covered Bridge) left in the state with the king post design, and one of only two in the town (the other being the Great Eddy Covered Bridge). In 1976 repairs were made to the then dilapidating structure. Concrete caps were added to the abutments and steel I-beams were added just below the deck, so that only an overload condition would require the additional support of the beams. The trusses also received attention. In 1989 the deck was replaced.

See also
List of covered bridges in Vermont
List of bridges documented by the Historic American Engineering Record in Vermont
List of bridges on the National Register of Historic Places in Vermont
National Register of Historic Places listings in Washington County, Vermont

References

External links

Buildings and structures in Waitsfield, Vermont
Bridges completed in 1872
Covered bridges on the National Register of Historic Places in Vermont
King post truss bridges in the United States
Wooden bridges in Vermont
Covered bridges in Washington County, Vermont
Historic American Engineering Record in Vermont
National Register of Historic Places in Washington County, Vermont
Road bridges on the National Register of Historic Places in Vermont
Historic district contributing properties in Vermont
1872 establishments in Vermont